The World's Smallest Political Quiz is a ten question educational quiz, designed primarily to be more accurate than the one-dimensional "left–right" or "liberal–conservative" political spectrum by providing a two-dimensional representation. The Quiz is composed of two parts: a diagram of a political map; and a series of 10 short questions designed to help viewers quickly score themselves and others on that map.

The 10 questions are divided into two groups, economic and personal, of five questions each. The answers to the questions can be Agree, Maybe or Disagree. Twenty points are given for an Agree, ten points for a Maybe, and zero for Disagree. The scores are added for each group and can be zero to one hundred. These two numbers are then plotted on the diamond-shaped chart and the result displays the political group that agrees most with the quiz taker. The map consists of two dimensions: Progressive – Moderate – Conservative and Libertarian – Moderate – Authoritarian. Those who score 100 are plotted in the top as Libertarian, those scoring a 0 are plotted on the bottom as Authoritarian, those who score 100 at personal, and 0 at economic are placed as Progressive to the left, and vice versa if someone scores 0 at personal and 100 at economic they are placed at the right as conservative. A score of 50 of both places the quiz-taker in the middle as Moderate. The edges for Moderate goes at between 35 and 65 on each scale. 

The quiz was designed primarily for an American audience designed by the non-partisan libertarian organization Advocates for Self Government and published on a web page of that organization. The quiz was created by Marshall Fritz, and associates the quiz-taker with one of five categories: libertarian, left-liberal, centrist, right-conservative, or statist.

History 

The chart associated with the Quiz is based on the Nolan Chart devised during 1969 by libertarian political scientist David Nolan.  Nolan reasoned that virtually all human political action can be divided into two general categories: economic and personal. In order to express visually this insight, Nolan developed a two axis graph. One axis was for economic freedom, and the other was for personal freedom.

Nolan introduced his chart by an article entitled "Classifying and Analyzing Politico-Economic Systems" published in the January 1971 issue of The Individualist, a libertarian newsletter.

In 1985, Marshall Fritz founded the Advocates for Self Government. Part of the Advocates' mission was to explain libertarian ideas to the public. Fritz found that Nolan's chart was a great help with explaining how libertarianism was distinct from conservatism and liberalism. He created the Quiz in 1987, and it was the first political Quiz posted on the Internet.

The first form the Quiz took was as a business card, with the ten questions printed on it along with the chart.  As of August 2004, over 7 million Quizzes had been printed.  The Quiz, then, is a combination of two elements: Nolan's chart, and Fritz's idea of ten short questions to help a person find their associated place on that graph.

The quiz has also been represented in other forms: reprinted in newspapers, used in classrooms, and recommended by leading high school and college textbooks.  During 1993, Brian Towey, with the help of his wife Ingrid, produced a full-color, instant-scoring computer Quiz on disk, for the DOS and Windows operating systems.  Programmer Jon Kalb created an equally advanced version for Macintosh computers.  Toby Nixon created an ASCII text copy of the Quiz in the era prior to the World Wide Web, and this version was circulated in newsgroups, computer networks, bulletin boards, and on software.  During 1995, Paul Schmidt created the Advocates' website, with the current interactive version of the World's Smallest Political Quiz.

As of November 1, 2013, the online World's Smallest Political Quiz has been taken 20 million times since it was first put on the Web in 1995.

Modifications to questions 
Six of the ten questions were substantially revised, or replaced entirely, in 2004.

 Former questions that were removed
 Let peaceful people cross borders freely.
 Minimum wage laws cause unemployment. Repeal them.
 All foreign aid should be privately funded.

 New questions that were added
 There should be no National ID card.
 Let people control their own retirement; privatize Social Security.
 Replace government welfare with private charity.

 Revised questions
 People are better off with free trade than with tariffs. → End government barriers to international free trade.
 End taxes. Pay for services with user fees. → Cut taxes and government spending by 50% or more.
 Businesses and farms should operate without government subsidies. → End "corporate welfare." No government handouts to business.

Uses 
On August 23, 2000, Portrait of America conducted a national telephone survey of 822 likely voters.  Using the same questions and scale, the survey found 32% of American voters are centrists; 16% are libertarians; 14% are authoritarians; 13% liberal; 7% are conservative; and, 17% border one or more categories.  The margin of sampling error is +/- 3 percentage points with a 95% level of confidence.

According to e-mails collected by the quiz's advocates, it has been used in 420 schools in the United States. The online content associated with several textbooks is also claimed to feature the Quiz.

See also 
 Political spectrum

References 

American political websites
Libertarian publications
Political science theories
Political spectrum